Stictobaris is a genus of flower weevils in the beetle family Curculionidae. There are about eight described species in Stictobaris.

Species
These eight species belong to the genus Stictobaris:
 Stictobaris cribrata (LeConte, 1876)
 Stictobaris hirtella Hustache, A., 1924
 Stictobaris hirtellus Hustache, 1924
 Stictobaris ornatella Casey, 1920
 Stictobaris pimalis Casey, 1892
 Stictobaris primalis Casey, T.L., 1892
 Stictobaris subacuta Casey, 1892
 Stictobaris tubifera Casey, 1920

References

Further reading

 
 
 

Baridinae
Articles created by Qbugbot